Kim Ok-hui (born 6 October 1979) is a North Korean speed skater.  She competed in the women's 1000 metres at the 1998 Winter Olympics.

References

1979 births
Living people
North Korean female speed skaters
Olympic speed skaters of North Korea
Speed skaters at the 1998 Winter Olympics
Place of birth missing (living people)